Commiphora myrrha, called myrrh, African myrrh, herabol myrrh, Somali myrrhor, common myrrh, is a tree in the Burseraceae family. It is one of the primary trees used in the production of myrrh, a resin made from dried tree sap.  The tree is native to the Arabian peninsula (Oman, Yemen) and to Africa (Djibouti, Ethiopia, Somalia, Northeast Kenya). It is called 'mur' (المر) in Arabic, meaning bitter. It famously comes from Mecca, so it is called 'Mur Makki'.

Description

Its short, hairless, thick, and flaky trunk has two layers of bark. The upper layer is silvery, whitish, reddish, or bluish-grey and has a papery-texture. Underneath it, the bark is green and performs photosynthesis.

Due to this species' high variability, Commiphora myrrha can be difficult to distinguish from other species within the Commiphora genus. The leaves of Commiphora myrrha are a greyish-green colour with a papery texture. The plant's leaves may come in an oblong or oval shape and are between 6-44mm long, and 3-20mm wide. Each leaf alternates and consists of three leaflets in a pinnately compound arrangement.

The plant's yellow-red flowers are dioecious and are arranged in a panicle inflorescence. The flowers of the common myrrh are very tiny and are oval shaped. The male flowers are only 3-4mm long and flower early. Its smooth, brown fruit is about the same size as the flowers, and is shaped like an egg.

Resin 
From the stem of Commiphora myrrha, its oleoresin oozes from incisions in the bark and dries into small clumps of sap. The resin's fragrance and its medicinal properties come from the various classes of terpenoids it contains. Additionally, the common myrrh tastes sour, bitter, and aromatic.

Distribution and habitat 
Native to eastern and northeastern Africa and the Arabian peninsula, this plant grows on slopes and valleys in desert regions with open Vachellia. It does best in thin soil, primarily in areas with limestone.

History 
Myrrh extracted from Commiphora myrrha was a precious commodity in the ancient world, as it was used to create perfumes and incense. Myrrh was traditionally used in the ancient world as an insect repellent, incense for religious rituals and in embalming the dead. Physicians also took advantage of its medicinal properties, treating it for several ailments, including wounds, diseases such as leprosy and syphilis, and to help with digestion and menstruation.

Medicinal properties 
It is anti-bacterial, anti-fungal, anti-pest and can be used for fumigation or oral use. It has been used as an astringent, antiseptic, anti-parasitic, anti-viral anti-tussive, emmenagogue, and anti-spasmodic agent. It was commonly included in mixtures used to treat worms, wounds, and sepsis. It is also a potent treatment for gingivitis, canker sores, sore throat, boils, arthritis, and acne. Due to its medicinal properties, it is imagined as a potential preventative and therapeutic agent for several diseases, including COVID-19.

Modern uses 
Resin from Commiphora myrrha continues to be an important source of myrrh, which is a key ingredient that adds flavour to meat products, desserts, soft drinks, gum, and sweets. Moreover, its use as a fragrance in incense has extended to other cosmetic products, such as mouthwash, soaps, and perfumes.

References

External links 

myrrha
Medicinal plants of Africa
Medicinal plants of Asia
Trees of the Arabian Peninsula
Flora of Oman
Flora of Djibouti
Flora of Ethiopia
Flora of Somalia
Flora of Kenya